The .470 Nitro Express is a rifle cartridge developed  by Joseph Lang in England for dangerous game hunting in Africa and India. This cartridge is used almost exclusively in double rifles. It is in wide use in the Southern and Central-East African region, favoured by hunting guides, primarily while out for hunting Cape buffalo and elephant.

Overview
The .470 NE was originally designed by Lang's as a replacement for the .450 Nitro Express, after the .450 NE was banned in several British colonies including India in 1907 (its bullets could theoretically be removed from loaded rounds for use by natives in stolen .577/.450 Martini Henry rifles). Due to the heavy bullet and powder charge, the gun has significant recoil but this is mitigated by the low velocity, resulting in recoil being delivered as a strong push rather than a violent blow. Rifles chambered for this cartridge tend to be heavy double-gun style, and are typically quite expensive.

The .470 NE continues to be the most popular of all the Nitro Express cartridges. Ammunition and components are readily available.

Handloading
Like other 'dangerous game' cartridges, ammunition is expensive compared with standard hunting cartridges, often costing up to 10 times more per shell than typical cartridges such as the .30-06. Because of this many shooters choose to handload the .470 NE. Brass can be obtained from a variety of sources, and like most reloading components varies in quality. Lighter loads for practice can be created that are more enjoyable and cheaper to shoot.

In popular culture
Author and adventurer James S. Gardner provides a realistic, detailed account of the capabilities of a Nitro Express during an ill-fated safari, and again in a graphical account of a desperate firefight against men and a helicopter in his book, The Lion Killer.

See also
 List of rifle cartridges
 11 mm caliber other cartridges of similar size.
 Nitro Express

References

 Cartridge capacity:

External links
 .470 Nitro Express 
 https://web.archive.org/web/20180123113335/http://www.458express.com/
 Comparing the Big Bores
 "470 Nitro Express load data" from Accurate Reloading
 "The Big Bore Nitro Express Cartridges" by Chuck Hawks
 "470 Nitro Express ballistic data" from Norma
 ".470 Nitro Express history and loading data" from Norma

Pistol and rifle cartridges
British firearm cartridges